During the 1987–88 English football season, Everton F.C. competed in the Football League First Division. They finished 4th in the table with 70 points. The Toffees advanced to the 5th round of the FA Cup, losing to Liverpool, and to the semifinals of the League Cup, losing to Arsenal.

Final league table

Results

Football League First Division

FA Cup

League Cup

Full Members Cup

FA Charity Shield

Dubai Super Cup

*Rangers won the match 5–3 on penalties

Squad

References

Everton F.C. seasons
Everton
Everton F.C. season